The Hôtel Louvre et Paix (a.k.a. Hôtel de la Marine) is a historic building in Marseille, France. Dedicated in 1863 as a luxury hotel, it was used by the Kriegsmarine during World War II. It now houses city administration offices and a C&A store.

Location
It is located at numbers 49–53 on the Canebière near the Old Port, in the 1st arrondissement of Marseille.

History
The hotel was built in the 1860s, at a time when the Canebière was a meeting place for high society. It was designed by architect Jean-Charles Pot. Sculptor Hippolyte Ferrat designed four caryatids on the front wall (a sphinx for America, an elephant for Asia, a dromedary for Africa, a fish for Europe) as well as two sculptures on the pediment surrounding the clock. The hotel was dedicated in 1863.

During World War II, the hotel played a significant role. It was a used by the French Navy from March 11, 1941, onwards. Later, it was used by the Kriegsmarine, the navy of Nazi Germany.

It now houses city administration offices and a C&A store.

Architectural significance
It has been listed as an official monument since 1982.

See also

References

Monuments historiques of Marseille
Buildings and structures completed in 1863
Defunct hotels in France
Kriegsmarine
19th-century architecture in France